Indiana University (IU) is a system of public universities in the U.S. state of Indiana.

Campuses
Indiana University has two core campuses, five regional campuses, and two regional centers under the administration of IUPUI. 
Indiana University Bloomington (IU Bloomington) is the flagship campus of Indiana University. The Bloomington campus is home to numerous premier Indiana University schools, including the College of Arts and Sciences, the Jacobs School of Music, an extension of the Indiana University School of Medicine, the School of Informatics, Computing, and Engineering, which includes the former School of Library and Information Science (now Department of Library and Information Science), School of Optometry, the O'Neil School of Public and Environmental Affairs, the Maurer School of Law, the School of Education, and the Kelley School of Business.
Indiana University–Purdue University Indianapolis (IUPUI), a partnership between Indiana University and Purdue University, is Indiana’s urban research and academic health sciences campus. Located just west of downtown Indianapolis, it is the central location of several Indiana University schools, including the primary campus of the School of Medicine, the School of Health and Rehabilitation Sciences, the Purdue School of Engineering and Technology, the School of Informatics and Computing, the School of Dentistry, the Kelley School of Business, the School of Nursing, the O'Neil School of Public and Environmental Affairs, the School of Social Work, the Herron School of Art and Design, the world’s first School of Philanthropy, and the Robert H. McKinney School of Law. On August 12, 2022, the boards of trustees of both Purdue and IU announced that IUPUI will split into two separate universities, with completion of the split to be finished by the fall 2024 semester.

In addition to its core campuses, Indiana University maintains five regional campuses throughout Indiana:

Indiana University East (IU East) established 1971, located in Richmond.
Indiana University Kokomo (IU Kokomo) established 1945, located in Kokomo.
Indiana University Northwest (IU Northwest) established 1963, located in Gary.
Indiana University South Bend (IU South Bend) established 1922, located in South Bend.
Indiana University Southeast (IU Southeast or IUS) established 1941, located in New Albany.

Finally, there are two regional campuses under the administration of IUPUI:

Indiana University–Purdue University Columbus (IUPUC) established 1970, located in Columbus. What the impending 2024 split of IUPUI means for IUPUC is still uncertain. 
Indiana University Fort Wayne (IU Fort Wayne) established 2018, located in Fort Wayne. It was established after the dissolution of the former entity Indiana University–Purdue University Fort Wayne (IPFW), which had been an extension similar to that of IUPUI under the administration of Purdue University. IU Fort Wayne took over IPFW's academic programs in health sciences, with all other IPFW academic programs taken over by the new entity, Purdue University Fort Wayne (PFW).
The School of Medicine and the School of Social Work have degree programs running across multiple IU campuses. Kelley School of Business, the School of Informatics, Computing, and Engineering, the O'Neil School of Public and Environmental Affairs, and the School of Education have degree programs at both the Indiana University Bloomington (IU Bloomington) and Indiana University–Purdue University Indianapolis (IUPUI) campuses. The School of Nursing has degree programs at the IUB, IUPUI, and IU Fort Wayne campuses. The Richard M. Fairbanks School of Public Health has degree programs at the IUPUI and IU Fort Wayne campuses.

Endowment 
According to the National Association of College and University Business Officers (NACUBO), the value of the endowment of the Indiana University and affiliated foundations in 2016 is over $1.986 billion. The annual budget across all campuses totals over $3 Billion.

The Indiana University Research and Technology Corporation (IURTC) is a not-for-profit agency that assists IU faculty and researchers in realizing the commercial potential of their discoveries. Since 1997, university clients have been responsible for more than 1,800 inventions, nearly 500 patents, and 38 start-up companies.

In fiscal year 2016, the IURTC was issued 53 U.S. patents and 112 global patents.

Notable alumni 

Jerome Adams –  American anesthesiologist and 20th surgeon general of the United States
Laura Aikin – operatic coloratura soprano
Trigger Alpert – Jazz bassist for the Glenn Miller Orchestra
OG Anunoby – Professional basketball player, currently playing for the Toronto Raptors
Howard Ashman – Oscar-winning playwright and lyricist, known for The Little Mermaid and Beauty and the Beast
Emilie Autumn – Violinist and singer
Agnes Nebo von Ballmoos – Liberian ethnomusicologist, choral conductor, composer
Jonathan Banks — actor known from Breaking Bad, Airplane!
David Bell - Author of Cemetery Girl and The Hiding Place
Joshua Bell – Grammy Award-winning violinist and conductor
Howard Biddulph - political scientist specializing in the Soviet Union
Thomas Bryant – Professional basketball player, currently playing for the Washington Wizards
Meg Cabot – Author of The Princess Diaries series, The Mediator series, and stand-alone novels. 
Bob Chapek - CEO of the Walt Disney Company 
Hoagy Carmichael – Composer, pianist, singer, actor, and bandleader
John T. Chambers – Chairman and former CEO of Cisco Systems
Calbert Cheaney - Professional basketball player and assistant coach
Nicole Chevalier – Operatic soprano
Sougwen Chung – Multidisciplinary visual and performance artist
Alton Dorian Clark (known by stage name Dorian) – Hip-hop recording artist and record producer
Sarah Clarke - Actress
Pamela Coburn - soprano
Suzanne Collins – Author of The Underland Chronicles and The Hunger Games trilogy
Laverne Cox - Actress known for Orange is the New Black, LGBT advocate
Mark Cuban – Owner of the NBA's Dallas Mavericks
John Cynn – Professional poker player. 2018 World Series of Poker (WSOP) Champion.
Mary Czerwinski – Computer scientist at Microsoft Research and Fellow of the Association for Computing Machinery
Alex Dickerson (born 1990) – baseball player
Colin Donnell - Actor and singer
Thomas P. Dooley – author, minister and research scientist
Judith Lynn Ferguson, author of 65 cookery related books, cookery editor of Woman's Realm women's magazine, and Head of Diploma Course at Le Cordon Bleu- London
Julia Garner -Actress
George Goehl – Community organizer, activist and executive director of People's Action
Neil Goodman – Sculptor and educator
Eric Gordon – Professional basketball player, currently playing for the Houston Rockets
Hardy - Country music singer and songwriter
Michael D. Higgins – 9th President of Ireland
Jordan Howard – Professional Football Player
Lissa Hunter – Artist
Jamie Hyneman – Host of the television series MythBusters 
Narendra Jadhav – Economist, educationist, and writer
Richard G. Johnson – Acting Science Adviser to Ronald Reagan (1986), physics professor at University of Bern, and manager of the Space Sciences Laboratory of University of California – Berkeley.
William E. Jenner – Indiana state senator and U.S. Senator
Jason Jordan – Professional wrestler
Wilbur Lin, orchestra conductor
Nina Kasniunas – Political scientist, author, and professor
E.W. Kelley – Businessman; former chairman of Steak 'n Shake restaurants
Kevin Kline — actor
J. Lee – Lt. Cmdr. John LaMarr. The Orville and The Lion King (2019 film)
Judith McCulloh – Folklorist, ethnomusicologist, and university press editor
Sylvia McNair – singer
Kristin Merscher – pianist; professor at the Hochschule für Musik Saar
Christopher Mattheisen – American-Hungarian businessman, historian, economist, CEO of Magyar Telekom 
Keith O'Conner Murphy - International recording artist, singer, songwriter, rockabilly hall of fame
Ryan Murphy – Film and TV screenwriter, director, and producer
Gregory Nagy – Classical scholar at Harvard University
Victor Oladipo – Professional basketball player, currently playing for the Miami Heat 
Jane Pauley – Journalist, TV anchor on CBS This Morning
 Mike Pence – 48th Vice President of the United States; 50th Governor of Indiana
 Ernie Pyle - Pulitzer Prize Winning American Journalist
Catt Sadler – TV personality for E! News
Jay Schottenstein – CEO of Schottenstein Stores
Kyle Schwarber – Professional baseball player, currently with the Philadelphia Phillies
Will Shortz - N. Y. Times crossword puzzle editor
Ranveer Singh – Bollywood actor
Tavis Smiley – Host of The Tavis Smiley Show; author
James B. Smith – Dean of Engineering, Technology, and Aeronautics at Southern New Hampshire University; former U.S. Ambassador to Saudi Arabia
Mary McCarty Snow - composer
Sage Steele - Sports Anchor for ESPN’s SportsCenter
Brad Stephens – former Australian rules football player
Straight No Chaser – A cappella group
Jeri Taylor – Television screenwriter and producer
Miles Taylor, GOP staffer who made an anti-Trump ad for Republican Voters Against Trump
Randy Tobias – Former Administrator of USAID; former CEO of Eli Lilly & Company
Isiah Thomas – Professional basketball player and coach
Michael E. Uslan – Producer of the Batman films and first instructor to teach an accredited course on comic book folklore at a university
Noah Vonleh – Professional basketball player, currently a free agent
Jimmy Wales – Entrepreneur; co-founder of Wikipedia
Aaron Waltke - Emmy-award winning screenwriter and television producer
James Watson – Molecular biologist, geneticist, and zoologist; Nobel Prize winner
Cody Zeller – Professional basketball player, currently for the Miami Heat

Notable faculty
 Carolyn Begley – Emerita Professor of Optometry and medical researcher
 Asher Cohen - psychologist and President of the Hebrew University of Jerusalem
 Daniel P. Friedman - professor of Computer Science 
 Ronald A. Hites - chemist
 Elinor Ostrom - Nobel laureate and political economist
 Richard DiMarchi -  chairman in Biomolecular Sciences and professor of Chemistry

Athletics

Awards 
Indiana University has three medals to recognize individuals.
The University Medal, the only IU medal that requires approval from the Board of Trustees, was created in 1982 by then IU President John W. Ryan and is the highest award bestowed by the University. It honors individuals for singular or noteworthy contributions, including service to the university and achievement in arts, letters, science, and law. The first recipient was Thomas T. Solley, former director of the IU Art Museum.
Indiana University President's Medal for Excellence honors individuals for distinction in public service, service to Indiana University, achievement in a profession, and/or extraordinary merit and achievement in the arts, humanities, science, education, and industry. The first recipients were member of the Beaux Arts Trio on September 20, 1985.
Thomas Hart Benton Mural Medallion "recognizes individuals who are shining examples of the values of IU and the universal academic community." President Ryan was the first to award this honor. It was first awarded to the president of Nanjing University on July 21, 1986. It honors individuals for distinction in public office or service, a significant relationship to Indiana University or Indiana, significant service to IU programs, students, or faculty, significant contribution to research or support for research.

Indiana University has several ways to recognize the accomplishments of faculty.

Distinguished Professorships – Indiana University's most prestigious academic appointment
University Distinguished Teaching Awards – recognizing "shining examples of dedication and excellence"
Thomas Ehrlich Award for Excellence in Service Learning – recognizing excellence in service-learning. The recipient is also the IU nominee for the national Campus Compact Thomas Ehrlich Award for Service Learning.

References

Further reading
 Capshew, James H. Herman B Wells: The Promise of the American University (Indiana University Press, 2012) 460 pp (excerpt and text search)
 Clark, Thomas D. Indiana University, Midwest Pioneer, Volume I: The Early Years (1970)
 Clark, Thomas D. Indiana University: Midwestern Pioneer, Vol II In Mid-Passage (1973)
 Clark, Thomas D. Indiana University: Midwestern Pioneer: Volume III/ Years of Fulfillment (1977) covers 1938–68 with emphasis on Wells. 
 Gray, Donald J., ed. The Department of English at Indiana University, Bloomington, 1868–1970 (1974)
 Gros Louis, Kenneth., "Herman B Wells and the Legacy of Leadership at Indiana University" Indiana Magazine of History (2007) 103#3 pp 290–301 online

Primary sources
 Wells, Herman B Being Lucky: Reminiscences and Reflections (1980) (excerpt and text search)

External links

 

 
Educational institutions established in 1820
Public universities and colleges in Indiana
Public university systems in the United States
1820 establishments in Indiana